Francis Renaud may refer to:

Francis Renaud (actor), French cinema actor
Francis Renaud (sculptor), French sculptor from Brittany